Medazepam is a drug that is a benzodiazepine derivative. It possesses anxiolytic, anticonvulsant, sedative, and skeletal muscle relaxant properties. It is known by the following brand names:  Azepamid, Nobrium, Tranquirax (mixed with bevonium), Rudotel, Raporan, Ansilan and Mezapam. Medazepam is a long-acting benzodiazepine drug. The half-life of medazepam is 36–200 hours.

Pharmacology
Medazepam acts as a prodrug to diazepam, as well as nordazepam, temazepam and oxazepam.
Benzodiazepine drugs including medazepam increase the inhibitory processes in the cerebral cortex by allosteric modulation of the GABA receptor. Benzodiazepines may also act via micromolar benzodiazepine-binding sites as Ca2+ channel blockers and significantly inhibited depolarization-sensitive calcium uptake in experiments with cell components from rat brains. This has been conjectured as a mechanism for high dose effects against seizures in a study. It has major active benzodiazepine metabolites, which gives it a more prolonged therapeutic effect after administration.

See also 
Benzodiazepine
Benzodiazepine dependence
Benzodiazepine withdrawal syndrome
Long-term effects of benzodiazepines

References

External links 
 Inchem - Medazepam

Benzodiazepines
Chloroarenes
GABAA receptor positive allosteric modulators